Aghasi Mammadov (born 1 June 1980) is an Azerbaijani boxer who competed in the bantamweight division (54 kg) at the 2004 Summer Olympics and won the bronze medal.

Career 
Mammadov competed for Turkey for several years, under the name Ağasi  Agagüloğlu, for instance at the 2000 Summer Olympics in Sydney.

Olympic results 2000 (as a bantamweight) 
Defeated Mai Kangde (China) 17-4
Defeated Nehomar Cermeño (Venezuela) 11-3
Lost to Guillermo Rigondeaux (Cuba) 5-14

He returned to Azerbaijan before the 2002 European Championships, and now competes for Azerbaijan. A year later, at the 2003 World Amateur Boxing Championships in Bangkok, he won the world title in the Bantamweight Division in the finals against Gennady Kovalev.
In the second round he sensationally beat Cuban superstar Guillermo Rigondeaux 16:13 after losing to him in Sydney and Belfast. He qualified for the 2004 Summer Olympics by ending up in first place at the 4th AIBA European 2004 Olympic Qualifying Tournament in Baku, Azerbaijan.

Olympic results 2004 (as a bantamweight) 
Defeated Joel Brunker (Australia) RSC 3 (0:59)
Defeated Detelin Dalakliev (Bulgaria) 35-16
Defeated Maksym Tretyak (Ukraine) 32-12
Lost to Worapoj Petchkoom (Thailand) 19-27

References 
 

1980 births
Living people
Sportspeople from Baku
Azerbaijani male boxers
Boxers at the 2004 Summer Olympics
Olympic boxers of Azerbaijan
Olympic bronze medalists for Azerbaijan
Boxers at the 2000 Summer Olympics
Olympic boxers of Turkey
Turkish people of Azerbaijani descent
Naturalized citizens of Turkey
Olympic medalists in boxing
Azerbaijani emigrants to Turkey
Bantamweight boxers
Medalists at the 2004 Summer Olympics
Turkish male boxers
European champions for Turkey
AIBA World Boxing Championships medalists
Mediterranean Games gold medalists for Turkey
Competitors at the 2001 Mediterranean Games
Mediterranean Games medalists in boxing